Alaska may refer to either of two places in the U.S. state of Pennsylvania:

Alaska, Jefferson County, Pennsylvania
Alaska, Northumberland County, Pennsylvania